is a former Japanese international table tennis player.

Table tennis career
She won a gold medal at the 1975 World Table Tennis Championships in the doubles with Maria Alexandru.

In addition to the gold she also won a bronze medal in the team events of 1975 and 1979 for Japan.

See also
 List of table tennis players
 List of World Table Tennis Championships medalists

References

Living people
Japanese female table tennis players
Asian Games medalists in table tennis
Table tennis players at the 1974 Asian Games
Medalists at the 1974 Asian Games
Asian Games bronze medalists for Japan
World Table Tennis Championships medalists
Year of birth missing (living people)